The 1932 New South Wales state election was for 90 electoral districts each returning a single member with compulsory preferential voting.

Results by electoral district

Albury

Annandale 

 Preferences were not distributed.

Armidale

Arncliffe

Ashburnham

Ashfield

Auburn

Balmain 

 Preferences were not distributed.

Bankstown

Barwon 

 Preferences were not distributed.

Bathurst 

 Gordon Wilkins was endorsed jointly by the Country and United Australia Parties.

Bondi 

 Preferences were not distributed.

Botany 

 Preferences were not distributed.

Bulli 

 Preferences were not distributed.

Burwood 

 Preferences were not distributed.

Byron

Canterbury

Casino 

 Preferences were not distributed.

Castlereagh 

 Preferences were not distributed.

Cessnock

Clarence

Cobar 

 Preferences were not distributed.

Concord 

 Preferences were not distributed.

Coogee

Cootamundra 

 Preferences were not distributed.

Corowa 

 Richard Ball was elected at the 1930 election as a Nationalist candidate, but joined the Country party instead of the UAP.

Croydon

Drummoyne

Dubbo 

|- style="background-color:#E9E9E9"
! colspan="6" style="text-align:left;" |After distribution of preferences

 Preferences were not distributed to completion.

Dulwich Hill

Georges River 

 Preferences were not distributed.

Glebe 

 Preferences were not distributed.

Gloucester 

 Preferences were not distributed.

Gordon

Goulburn

Granville

Hamilton 

 Preferences were not distributed.

Hartley 

 Preferences were not distributed.
 Horace Bracey was jointly endorsed by the UAP and Country party.

Hawkesbury 

 Preferences were not distributed.

Hornsby

Hurstville 

 Preferences were not distributed.

Illawarra

King 

 Preferences were not distributed.

Kogarah

Kurri Kurri

Lachlan 

 Preferences were not distributed.

Lakemba

Lane Cove

Leichhardt 

 Preferences were not distributed.

Lismore

Liverpool Plains

Maitland

Manly

Marrickville

Monaro 

 Preferences were not distributed.

Mosman

Mudgee 

 David Spring was jointly endorsed by the UAP and Country Party. In parliament, he caucused with the Country party.

Murray

Murrumbidgee

Namoi

Nepean

Neutral Bay

Newcastle 

 Preferences were not distributed.

Newtown 

 Preferences were not distributed.

North Sydney 

 Preferences were not distributed.

Orange

Oxley

Paddington 

 Preferences were not distributed.

Parramatta 

 Preferences were not distributed.

Petersham

Phillip 

 Preferences were not distributed.

Raleigh

Randwick 

 Preferences were not distributed.

Redfern 

 Preferences were not distributed.

Ryde 

 Preferences were not distributed.

South Coast

Sturt

Tamworth 

 Preferences were not distributed.

Temora 

 Preferences were not distributed.

Tenterfield

Upper Hunter 

William Cameron died and Malcolm Brown won the resulting by-election, standing as a  candidate at this election.

Vaucluse

Wagga Wagga

Waratah 

|- style="background-color:#E9E9E9"
! colspan="6" style="text-align:left;" |After distribution of preferences

 Preferences were not distributed to completion.
 Arthur Griffiths was jointly endorsed by the UAP and Country Party.

Waverley 

 Preferences were not distributed.

Willoughby

Wollondilly 

 Preferences were not distributed.

Woollahra

Yass

Young

See also 

 Candidates of the 1932 New South Wales state election
 Members of the New South Wales Legislative Assembly, 1932–1935

Notes

References 

1932